Ercta is a genus of moths of the family Crambidae.

Species
Ercta dixialis Snellen, 1895
Ercta elutalis (Walker, 1859)
Ercta pedicialis Snellen, 1895
Ercta scotialis Hampson, 1912
Ercta trichoneura Hampson, 1912
Ercta vittata (Fabricius, 1794)

References

Spilomelinae
Crambidae genera
Taxa named by Francis Walker (entomologist)